Malthinus is a genus of soldier beetles in the family Cantharidae; species have been recorded from Europe, N. America and Japan. There are more than 140 described species in Malthinus.

See also
 List of Malthinus species

References

Further reading

External links

 

Cantharidae
Articles created by Qbugbot